The 2021 ICC Men's T20 World Cup Americas Qualifier was a cricket tournament that was played as part of the qualification process for the 2022 ICC Men's T20 World Cup. It took place in November 2021 in Antigua, with the top two teams progressing to one of two global qualifiers. In April 2018, the International Cricket Council (ICC) granted full international status to Twenty20 men's matches played between member sides from 1 January 2019 onwards. Therefore, all the matches in the Regional Qualifiers were played as Twenty20 Internationals (T20Is).

Originally the tournament was scheduled to take place from 18 to 24 August 2020. However, in June 2020, the tournament was postponed until 2021, due to the COVID-19 pandemic. In December 2020, the ICC updated the qualification pathway following the disruption from the pandemic. In May 2021, the tournament was postponed again due to the pandemic, after being scheduled to take place from 17 to 23 July 2021 in Toronto, Canada. The ICC confirmed all the fixtures for the Americas Qualifier in October 2021.

The United States became the first team to reach the Global Qualifiers, after they won their first five matches. Canada finished in second position to also secure their place in the Global Qualifiers.

Regional Final

Squads

Points table

 advanced to the global qualifier

Fixtures

References

External links
 Series home at ESPN Cricinfo

Associate international cricket competitions in 2021–22
Qualifiers
ICC Men's T20 World Cup Americas Qualifier
ICC